The Wern is a river in Bavaria, Germany. It is a right tributary of the river Main, which it joins in Wernfeld.

Etymology
The name was written in the 8th century as Werma and around the year 1015 as Werina. It is likely derived from the Indo-European root wódr̥ (pronounced udéns ), which means water or rain.

Course
The Wern originates between Rannungen and Pfersdorf. Although there is a designated source, called Aubrunnen about one kilometer northeast of the center of Pfersdorf this pours average only one to two liters per second and dries up completely in the summer. 
The Wern initially flows in a southerly direction, approaching the Main at Schweinfurt, but turning west 2 km away and flowing through the northern part of the Maindreieck . After approaching the Main near Karlstadt-Stetten, it changes its direction and continues northwards. At Gemünden-Wernfeld the Wern finally joins with the Main.

See also
List of rivers of Bavaria

References

Rivers of Bavaria
Rivers of Germany